Mia's Reading Adventure: The Search for Grandma's Remedy is a 1998 video game developed and published by Montreal-based studio Kutoka Interactive. The game is aimed at children age 5.

Reception
PC Magazine rated the game a 3 of 5 saying "Mia, though very well done will not do this for younger kids. For the older set, however - and especially for the girls - Mia should be a lot of fun."

Macworld rated the game a 4 of 5 saying "The dazzling artwork and sound complement the learning tools as children ages five to nine try to decipher where Mia should go next"

Game Vortex rated the game a 9 of 10 saying "If the engine were a bit smoother -- jumpiness on a 450 MHz machine is just frightening, considering the minimum system is a P100 -- this game would be practically perfect in both presentation and usefulness. As it is, Mia: The Search for Grandma’s Remedy is still a great game, marred by a few speed problems that detract only slightly from the enjoyment of a well-put-together edutainment title"

PC Alamode Magazine said "All in all, not a bad program for the kids and you may be quite pleased with it"

Sales
The game sold 40,000 copies by April 1999.

See also
 Mia's Big Adventure Collection

References 

1998 video games
Adventure games
Children's educational video games
Classic Mac OS games
Video games about insects
Video games about mice and rats
Video games featuring female protagonists
Video games developed in Canada
Windows games